Tell Me I'm Alive is the ninth studio album by American rock band All Time Low. It was released on March 17, 2023, by the label Fueled by Ramen.

Background and recording
The release of Wake Up, Sunshine in April 2020 coincided with the COVID-19 pandemic, preventing the band from touring. They continued to write music amidst global shutdowns; over the course of two years, the band wrote an estimated 30 songs, some of which became tracks on Tell Me I'm Alive. Vocalist Alex Gaskarth and guitarist Jack Barakat stated that many of the album's themes, such as loneliness, were drawn from emotions and experiences they had witnessed during the pandemic.

Composition
Critics of Tell Me I'm Alive have described the album as a blend of pop rock and pop punk. Tracks on the album prominently feature synth and piano.

In an interview with the Daily Express, Gaskarth described the album's sound as an "amalgation" of Last Young Renegade and Wake Up, Sunshine. He stated in a separate interview with Recovery Magazine that many songs on the album were influenced by artists like Queen and Elton John.

Reception

Critical reception towards Tell Me I'm Alive was mixed. Callum Crumlish praised the album's sound and lyrical quality. Mark Sutherland of Kerrang! acknowledged the band's growing maturity and praised Gaskarth's vocals, but noted that the music style shifted from pop-punk to pop rock and unfavorably compared songs "New Religion" and "Calm Down" to works by Maroon 5 and Ed Sheeran, respectively.

Track listing

Personnel
All Time Low
 Alex Gaskarth – vocals, guitar
 Jack Barakat – guitar
 Zack Merrick – bass guitar
 Rian Dawson – drums, percussion

Technical
 Ted Jensen – mastering
 Neal Avron – mixing

References 

2023 albums
All Time Low albums
Fueled by Ramen albums